Eunidia nigroapicalis is a species of beetle in the family Cerambycidae. It was described by Pic in 1925. It is known from Sumatra and Borneo.

References

Eunidiini
Beetles described in 1925